The Basilica of Junius Bassus (basilica Iunii Bassi) was a civil basilica on the Esquiline Hill in Rome, on a site now occupied by the Seminario Pontificio di Studi Orientali, in via Napoleone III, 3. It is best known for its examples of opus sectile work.

History
The basilica was built by Junius Bassus in 331 during his consulate. In the second half of the 5th century, under Pope Simplicius, it was transformed into the church of Sant'Andrea Catabarbara.

Rediscovery

Its last remains were rediscovered and demolished in 1930, and these excavations also found an Augustan house (with later rebuilding) containing 3rd century mosaics, one with Dionysian subjects and one with the names of the house's owners (Arippii and Ulpii Vibii). These mosaics are now on show in the seminary.

Sources

External links

Junius Bassus
4th-century churches
330s in the Roman Empire
4th-century establishments in Italy
331